The Legislature XII of Italy lasted from 15 April 1994 until 8 May 1996. Its composition was the one resulting from the snap general election of 27 March 1994. The election was called by President Scalfaro, after he dissolved the houses of Parliament on 16 January 1994. This decision was connected to some major events that permanently changed the shape of Italian internal politics during the beginning of the '90s, such as Tangentopoli and the Mafia trials.

This legislature marks the beginning of the so-called "Second Republic", characterised by the progressive decline and dismantlement of the traditional parties, such as the Christian Democracy, the Italian Socialist Party, the Italian Communist Party, and the Italian Social Movement. It also marks the official entrance of Silvio Berlusconi in Italian politics.

This was the first legislature to apply the new majoritarian electoral system (also known as Mattarellum), which replaced the proportional system in effect since 1946.

Government

Composition

Chamber of Deputies 
 President: Irene Pivetti (LN), elected on 16 April 1994
 Vice Presidents: Luciano Violante (PDS), Adriana Poli Bortone (AN, until 25 May 1994), Lorenzo Acquarone (PPI), Vittorio Dotti (FI, until 9 November 1994), Ignazio La Russa (AN, from 25 May 1994)

Senate of the Republic 
 President: Carlo Scognamiglio Pasini (FI), elected on 16 April 1994
 Vice Presidents: Carlo Rognoni (PDS), Michele Pinto (PPI), Marcello Staglieno (LN), Romano Misservile (AN)

Notes

 Of the 315 elected senators, 11 Senators for life were added at the beginning of the term distributed as follows:
 3 from the Partito Popolare Italiano: Giulio Andreotti, Carlo Bo, Amintore Fanfani
 1 from the group Progressisti – PSI: Francesco De Martino
 7 with no affiliation: Gianni Agnelli, Norberto Bobbio, Francesco Cossiga, Giovanni Leone, Giovanni Spadolini (died in August 1994), Paolo Emilio Taviani, Leo Valiani

References

Legislatures of Italy
1994 establishments in Italy
1996 disestablishments in Italy